Andy Meyrick (born 4 September 1985) is a British racing driver currently competing in the United SportsCar Championship and the Blancpain Endurance Series.

Racing career

Single seaters
Meyrick made his racing debut in the BRSCC Formula Ford 1600 North West championship at Oulton Park. He won the fifth race of his career and went on to win a total of ten races during the season, taking the Pre 90 class championship in a vintage Reynard 84FF. The following season he stepped up to the British Formula Ford Championship, driving for Cliff Dempsey Racing in the Ray GR06 alongside Peter Dempsey. Later in 2006 Meyrick joined Falcon Motorsport to drive in the Formula Renault BARC Championship, earning a pole position and a second-place finish  in his third outing, at Thruxton Circuit. After the 2007 Formula Renault UK Wintercup Meyrick joined Team West-Tec for two races in the British Formula Renault. The following season Meyrick stepped up to the British Formula Three Championship with Carlin Motorsport in the National class. He drove in twelve races in the championship, earning seven class victories and a fifth place in the championship.

Endurance racing
Meyrick turned his attention to sports car racing, entering the 2009 Le Mans Series season with Kolles driving an Audi R10 TDI. The team's best finish came at the 2009 1000 km of Nürburgring, where Meyrick,  Narain Karthikeyan and Charles Zwolsman Jr. finished fourth. Meyrick joined Dyson Racing in the American Le Mans Series for the 2010 12 Hours of Sebring and the 2010 Monterey Sports Car Championships. Also in 2010, Meyrick entered his first 24 Hours of Le Mans, partnering with Soheil Ayari and Didier André in an AIM Team Oreca Matmut Oreca 01. The team finished the race as the first non-Audi, taking fourth overall. Following this success he was signed by Aston Martin Racing to join their LMP1 program. The team's best result came at the 2011 6 Hours of Zhuhai, when the No. 007 car finished sixth. Meyrick also raced in the vintage Group C Racing championship, winning two out of four races with four podium finishes and earning the C2 class title. Meyrick drove one race in an Aston Martin AMR1 in the Group C Racing championship's C1 class, winning the race from pole.

In 2012 Meyrick entered the Porsche Carrera Cup Great Britain for five events. At his debut at the Knockhill Racing Circuit he finished third behind Michael Meadows and Sam Tordoff and went on to finish 13th in the championship. Meyrick joined the DeltaWing program at beginning of the 2013 American Le Mans Series season, just before the 12 Hours of Sebring. Katherine Legge joined the team at the second race of the season and the two drivers took the team to seventh in the P1 class standings. Meyrick and Legge each led eight laps at Road America, the first race lead for the revolutionary prototype.

Late in 2013, Meyrick signed on as a "Bentley Boy" and raced in the Blancpain Endurance Series for M-Sport in a factory-backed Bentley Continental GT. Meyrick was integral in the development of the car, which he drove to fourth place in its first outing at the Abu Dhabi Gulf 12 Hours. Meyrick returned to the works Bentley GT Team in 2014, winning at Silverstone and Paul Ricard, and with teammates Guy Smith and Steven Kane, finished second in both the drivers and team championship. Meyrick also continued driving the DeltaWing in the TUDOR United SportsCar Championship, with a season-high finish of fourth at the team's home race, Petit Le Mans at Road Atlanta. Meyrick was recognized for his achievements with the John Cobb Trophy from the British Racing Drivers' Club (BRDC).

In 2015, Meyrick drove the endurance events only for the DeltaWing team, focusing on the Bentley factory Blancpain campaign. The team won two races (Paul Ricard and Spa-Francorchamps) and finished runner up in the championship.

Meyrick returned to Blancpain Endurance Series competition, now dubbed the GT World Challenge Europe, in 2023, driving for Team Parker Racing in a Porsche 911 GT3 R (992). Teamed with Derek Pierce and Kiern Jewiss, Meyrick lined up in the newly-named Bronze Cup class.

Motorsports results

24 Hours of Le Mans results

WeatherTech SportsCar Championship
(key)(Races in bold indicate pole position, Results are overall/class)

References

External links
 
 Andy Meyrick on DriverDB.com

1985 births
Living people
British racing drivers
Blancpain Endurance Series drivers
WeatherTech SportsCar Championship drivers
Formula Ford drivers
British Formula Renault 2.0 drivers
American Le Mans Series drivers
24 Hours of Le Mans drivers
12 Hours of Sebring drivers
Formula Renault BARC drivers
24 Hours of Spa drivers
24 Hours of Daytona drivers
Porsche Carrera Cup GB drivers
Carlin racing drivers
Aston Martin Racing drivers
Oreca drivers
Kolles Racing drivers
Team West-Tec drivers
United Autosports drivers
Nürburgring 24 Hours drivers
Le Mans Cup drivers
GT4 European Series drivers
M-Sport drivers